Bordley is an unincorporated community in Union County, in the U.S. state of Kentucky.

History
A post office called Bordley was established in 1828, and remained in operation until 1911. A first settler named the community after one Mr. Bordley, a man he knew in England.

References

Unincorporated communities in Union County, Kentucky
Unincorporated communities in Kentucky